Watford Gap  is a low-lying area between two hills, close to the village of Watford, Northamptonshire, England. Engineers from Roman times onwards have found it to be an ideal route for connecting the Midlands with South East England. It has been written and spoken of as marking the divide between Northern England and Southern England.

Focal point
Watford Gap is a low point through a range of hills providing an easy route between the South Eastern and Midland areas of England. It is near the small village of Watford, Northamptonshire. In the era of Roman Britain, the Watling Street Roman road used the gap. The road here forms the A5, which for national journeys has been superseded by the M1 motorway which also passes through this gap.

Later the road was joined by the Leicester Line of the Grand Union Canal, which passes through the Watford Locks just to the north of the gap.

The historical geographic importance of the area led to many modern communication routes passing through this narrow gap: the coming of the railways brought the London and Birmingham Railway, now known as the West Coast Main Line; the most recent addition, in 1959, was the M1, Britain's first inter-urban motorway, bringing with it Watford Gap services, the first motorway service station.

Division

Geological divide
Topographically the gap is a pass (small cleft) caused by a tectonic plate shift (according to Roger Latham), between east and west hill ranges. A tributary of the River Nene rises at Watford and flows east to the Wash, whereas at Kilsby a tributary of the River Leam  rises and flows west.

Sociological divide

Isogloss

In linguistics the Watford Gap has become oft-quoted as where England experiences its division of north and south dialects. Specifically it is close to the north/south isogloss of the three key hallmarks of Northern English and Southern English: foot–strut split, bad-lad split and the Bath vowel, however traditionally follows most East Midlands accents.

North/South divide
Making use of the above linguistic divide, authors, journalists and social commentators have written and spoken of a North/South divide between Northern England and Southern England (although, in this context, the reference is sometimes assumed to be to the town of Watford in Hertfordshire, some 61 miles / 98 km to the southeast by road).

There is a well known expression, "North of Watford", which is used to mean the north of England, especially a place remote from London. This is often taken to mean "North of Watford Gap" because of the Watford Gap services being a main stopping point on the M1 motorway. However, the original expression was already in use many years before the Watford Gap Service Station or M1 opened in 1959. It is unknown whether the original expression referred to Watford, Northamptonshire, or the much larger Watford town in Hertfordshire, which was the last urban stop on the main railway line out of London to the north of England. There is evidence to support the latter, as the phrase "North of Watford Junction" was used with similar meaning in the past, referring to Watford Junction railway station at Watford, Hertfordshire.

Stagecoach route
Historically, this was a junction of the West Midlands to London or East Anglia stagecoach routes across England. Its coaching inn, the Watford Gap, plied the passing trade of the area.

The pub, as well as the route from Cambridge to Coventry, is mentioned as early as 1769. This route ran through Northampton, Duston, Harlestone, past Althorp Park, Brington, Long Buckby, Watford, Watford Gap itself—the map indicating that the coaching inn was on the west side of Watling Street, and then into Kilsby. The route from Watford Gap to Kilsby is now part of the diverted A5 road following construction of the M1 motorway.

The location of the Watford Gap coaching inn is the subject of confusion, with a location on the east side of the Grand Junction Canal (within the confines of the modern service station) being the most frequently cited, near the disused Welton railway station. There is no mention of a Watford Gap pub or any other pub at the suggested location on the 1889 or 1927 or 1952 Ordnance Survey maps of Northamptonshire. The nearest pub was the now-closed Stag's Head Inn in Station Road, Watford. The original location is further north on Watling Street and is shown on the 1889, 1927 and 1952 maps.

The canal-side building still stands but, as of 2000, has closed for business and needs renovation. The earlier Watford Gap Inn is also still standing and is in good repair and generally unaltered, with the stabling yards and main structures used as farm buildings. It can be easily viewed from the road: there is a parking lay-by on the southbound side of Watling Street.

Motorway service station

The village is now mainly known for the nearby Watford Gap services on the M1 motorway, which was the first motorway service station in the United Kingdom.

Cultural references
In his best-selling travelogue Up North: Travels Beyond the Watford Gap, Charles Jennings (a self-confessed southern public school wimp) is reluctantly forced to rethink his preconceptions, following the first chapter, with the many ways in which "the North" is socially and geographically as diverse as "the South", as the narrative increasingly finds efforts to depict a North/South divide as contrived.

Roy Harper's 1977 album Bullinamingvase contains a song titled "Watford Gap". Motorway service areas, which have since undergone radical innovations, were at the time in the United Kingdom typecast as spartan. The owners of Watford Gap services objected to his first reference to the place being ("Watford Gap, Watford Gap / A plate of grease and a load of crap…"). Harper was advised to drop the track from future UK copies of the album, though it reappeared on a CD reissue and remained on the American LP.

Liverpool F.C.'s 1988 song "Anfield Rap" makes reference to the relatively few players at the time with a northern accent and refers to the gap.

Notes and references
Notes 
  
References

External links

 Public House
 Services

Geography of Northamptonshire
Isoglosses